Three Palm Trees is a 1994 Portuguese film by João Botelho. It was screened at the Directors' Fortnight in Cannes. The film was selected as the Portuguese entry for the Best Foreign Language Film at the 67th Academy Awards, but was not accepted as a nominee.

See also
 List of submissions to the 67th Academy Awards for Best Foreign Language Film
 List of Portuguese submissions for the Academy Award for Best Foreign Language Film

References

External links

1994 films
Portuguese comedy-drama films
1990s Portuguese-language films
1994 comedy-drama films